Dromtön, Drom Tonpa or Dromtönpa Gyelwé Jungné (1004 or 1005–1064) was the chief disciple of the Buddhist master Atiśa, the initiator of the Kadam school of Tibetan Buddhism and the founder of Reting Monastery.

Early life and education 
Dromtönpa was born in Tolung at the beginning of the period of the second propagation of Buddhism in Tibet. "His father was Kushen Yaksherpen (sku gshen yag gsher 'phen) and his mother was Kuoza Lenchikma (khu 'od bza' lan gcig ma)." His father's title skugshen indicates he was an important figure in the Bon tradition. He began preaching in Tibet in 1042.

Career 
Dromtön is considered to be the 45th incarnation of Avalokiteśvara, an important bodhisattva and thus a member of the early lineage of the Dalai Lamas (the First Dalai Lama is said to have been the 51st incarnation).

Dromtön founded Reting Monastery in 1056 in the Reting Tsampo Valley north of Lhasa which became the seat of the Kadampa lineage and brought some relics of Atisha there.

Students
It was Dromtönpa's student Chekawa Yeshe Dorje who first compiled Atiśa's core teachings on the practice Lojong for developing of bodhicitta in written form, as The Seven Point Mind Training.

Footnotes

Further reading
 

1000s births
1064 deaths
11th-century lamas
11th-century Tibetan people
Kadampa lamas
Tibetan Buddhists from Tibet